Khuran-e Olya (also Romanized as Khūrān-e ‘Olyā; also known as Khūrān and Khvorān) is a village in Nabovat Rural District, in the Central District of Eyvan County, Ilam Province, Iran. At the 2006 census, its population was 615, in 111 families. The village is populated by Kurds.

References 

Populated places in Eyvan County
Kurdish settlements in Ilam Province